Nicotiana clevelandii is a species of wild tobacco known by the common name Cleveland's tobacco.

Its specific epithet clevelandii honors 19th-century San Diego-based plant collector and lawyer Daniel Cleveland.

It is native to northwestern Mexico and the southwestern United States in California and Arizona, where it grows in the Sonoran Desert, Colorado Desert, and in chaparral of the coastal canyons of the Peninsular Ranges and the Channel Islands of California.

Description

The inflorescence bears white or green-tinged flowers with tubular throats around 2 centimeters long, their bases enclosed in pointed sepals which are unequal in length. The flower face is about a centimeter wide with five mostly white lobes.

The fruit is a capsule about half a centimeter long.

Uses
This plant was used for a variety of medicinal purposes and smoked in rituals by the Cahuilla.

References

External links
Jepson Manual Treatment of Nicotiana clevelandii
Nicotiana clevelandii — U.C. Photo gallery

clevelandii
Flora of Arizona
Flora of Baja California
Flora of California
Flora of Sonora
Flora of the California desert regions
Flora of the Sonoran Deserts
Natural history of the California chaparral and woodlands
Natural history of the Colorado Desert
Natural history of the Channel Islands of California
Natural history of the Peninsular Ranges
Natural history of the Santa Monica Mountains
Plants used in traditional Native American medicine
Flora without expected TNC conservation status